Beltarla (also: Aşağı Beltarla) is a village in the Başmakçı District, Afyonkarahisar Province, Turkey. Its population is 370 (2021). It is located east of the district capital of Başmakçı.

References

Villages in Başmakçı District